Pacific Southwest Chapter of the National Television Academy is a division of the National Academy of Television Arts and Sciences. The San Diego, California division was founded in 1972. In addition to granting Emmy Awards for the Pacific Southwest region, this division awards scholarships, honors industry veterans at the Silver Circle Celebration, conducts National Student Television Awards of Excellence, has a free research and a nationwide job bank. The chapter also participates in judging Emmy entries at the regional and national levels.

Boundaries

The academy is divided into the following boundaries and encompasses the Pacific areas of California which includes, San Diego, Bakersfield, Palm Springs, San Luis Obispo, Santa Maria, Santa Barbara and Las Vegas, Nevada. These boundaries are responsible for the submission of television broadcast materials presented for awards considerations.

References

Regional Emmy Awards
Awards established in 1972
1972 establishments in California